is a Japanese film director.

Career
Inudo began making films on his own in high school, with one of his works being selected for the 1979 Pia Film Festival. After attending Tokyo Zokei University, he found work at Asahi Promotions where he began directing television commercials, including some award winning ones. He made his feature-length film debut in 1995 with Futari ga Shabette iru, which earned him the Directors Guild of Japan New Directors Award. Josee, the Tiger and the Fish (2003) earned him the Minister of Education New Director Award for Fine Art.

Filmography
 Futari ga Shabette Iru (1995)
 Across a Gold Prairie (1999)
 Josee, the Tiger and the Fish (2003)
 Blooming Again (2004)
 All About My Dog (2005)
 Touch (2005)
 House of Himiko (2005)
 Yellow Tears (2006)
 Bizan (2007)
 Zero Focus (2009)
 The Floating Castle (2012)
 The Cat In His Arms (2018)
 The Bucket List (2019)
 Haw (2022)

References

External links
 

Japanese film directors
1960 births
Living people
People from Tokyo
Tokyo Zokei University alumni